War Child is the seventh studio album by Jethro Tull, released in October 1974. It was released almost a year and a half after the release of A Passion Play. The turmoil over criticism of the previous album surrounded the production of War Child, which obliged the band to do press conferences and explain their plans for the future.

Recording

The band began recording songs for the album on 7 December 1973, starting with "Ladies". They recorded "The Third Hoorah" along with the outtake "Paradise Steakhouse" on 8 December, "War Child" and "Back-Door Angels" along with the outtake "Saturation" on 16 December, the sound effects from "Bungle in the Jungle", "Ladies", "Skating Away on the Thin Ice of the New Day" and "The Third Hoorah" along with the outtake "Good Godmother" and the orchestral piece "Mime Sequence" on 19 December, "Sea Lion" along with the outtake "Sea Lion II" on 6 January 1974, "Queen and Country" on 20 January 1974 and finally "Two Fingers" and "Bungle in the Jungle" along with the outtake "Tomorrow was Today" on 24 February 1974. The whole album was recorded at Morgan Studios, in London, except for tracks 6 and 8, which were recorded at the Château d'Hérouville, in France. According to the liner notes on the 2014 Theatre Edition reissue, War Child was a much more relaxed record to make, compared to the previous album and the Château d'Hérouville sessions. The studio equipment worked, the sound in the studio was very workable, and the atmosphere within the band was very settled and productive. "Only Solitaire" and "Skating Away" were recorded earlier, as detailed below.

Music
Much of the music derived from past recording sessions of the band. "Only Solitaire" and "Skating Away on the Thin Ice of the New Day" were left over from the summer 1972 writing sessions for what was to have been the follow-up to Thick as a Brick (1972). The basic tracks and lead vocals for those two songs were recorded during September 1972 sessions in France. "Bungle in the Jungle" also shares some elements with material recorded in September 1972. Ian Anderson told Songfacts: "It was actually late '72 or early '73 when I was in Paris recording an album that never got released, although one or two of the tracks made it out in 1974, but that was at a time when I was writing an album that was exploring people, the human condition, through analogies with the animal kingdom." "Two Fingers" is a rearrangement of "Lick Your Fingers Clean", a track from the Aqualung (1971) recording sessions that was not included on that album's original release.

Film
Originally meant to accompany a film project (the album was planned as a double-album set), it was reinstated as a ten-song, single-length rock album after failed attempts to find a major movie studio to finance the film. The "War Child" movie was written as a metaphysical black comedy concerning a teenage girl in the afterlife, meeting characters based on God, St. Peter and Lucifer portrayed as shrewd businessmen. Notable British actor Leonard Rossiter was to have been featured, Margot Fonteyn was to have choreographed, while Monty Python veteran John Cleese was pencilled in as a "humour consultant".

Packaging
The front cover is a composite photograph featuring a positive colour print of Melbourne at night, and a negative print of a studio photo of lead singer Ian Anderson. The back cover of the album contains images of people, including the five members of the band, friends, wives, girlfriends, Chrysalis Records staff, and manager Terry Ellis, all related to the song titles. Anderson's personal touring assistant (and future wife) Shona Learoyd appears as a ringmaster, while Terry Ellis appears as a leopard skin-clad, umbrella-waving aggressive businessman.

Music style and themes
The album prominently features Dee Palmer's string orchestration across an eclectic musical set, with the band members, as the two predecessor albums, playing a multitude of instruments. The music is lighter and more whimsical than the dark A Passion Play, with hints of comedy in the lyrics and the music's structure, although the lyrics still unleash lashing critiques of established society (as in "Queen and Country" and "Bungle in the Jungle"), religion ("Two Fingers") and critics ("Only Solitaire").

Releases
Tracks slated to accompany the film such as "Quartet" and "Warchild Waltz" (called "Waltz of the Angels" on the Theatre Edition) were unearthed and released across several Tull compilations, and finally all of them appeared on the 2002 CD reissue.

In 2014, to commemorate the album's 40th anniversary, War Child: The 40th Anniversary Theatre Edition was released; a 2 CD/2 DVD, limited edition package, remixed by Steven Wilson containing unreleased tracks, a promo video of "The Third Hoorah", orchestral pieces that were originally written for the film project, a script synopsis and track-by-track annotations by Ian Anderson.

Critical reception

The 1974 Rolling Stone review of the album is very harsh, as was the Rolling Stone review of A Passion Play: "Each handcrafted track comes chock-full of schmaltz, strings, tootie-fruitti sound effects and flute toots to boot, not to mention Anderson's warbling lyricism." Concluding, the reviewer said: "Remember: Tull rhymes with dull."

The AllMusic review, by Bruce Eder, recognizes the quality of the album and the musicians, but stated that: "[War Child] never made the impression of its predecessors, however, as it was a return to standard-length songs following two epic-length pieces. It was inevitable that the material would lack power, if only because the opportunity for development that gave Thick as a Brick and A Passion Play some of their power."

Covers
 "Rainbow Blues" was covered by Blackmore's Night, former Deep Purple's guitarist Ritchie Blackmore's band. The song was released on their 2003 album Ghost of a Rose. Blackmore's Night also performed the song live.

Track listing

1974 Original release

2002 Remaster

2014 The 40th Anniversary Theatre Edition

*Tracks 12-21: orchestral recordings

Personnel
Jethro Tull
 Ian Anderson – vocals, flute, acoustic guitar, alto, soprano and sopranino saxophones
 Martin Barre – electric guitar, Spanish guitar
 John Evan – piano, organ, synthesizers, accordion
 Jeffrey Hammond – lead vocals and spoken word (on "Sealion II"), bass guitar, string bass
 Barriemore Barlow – drums, percussion, glockenspiel, marimba

Additional personnel
 Dee Palmer – orchestral arrangements
 Robin Black – sound engineer
 Terry Ellis – executive producer

Charts

Certifications

References

External links
  (with Bonus Tracks)
 Jethro Tull - War Child (1974) album releases & credits at Discogs.com
 Jethro Tull - War Child (1974) album review by Thomas Bambaataa Ghidrah Towers at SputnikMusic.com
 Jethro Tull - War Child (1974/2002 Remaster) album to be listened as stream at Play.Spotify.com

Jethro Tull (band) albums
1974 albums
Chrysalis Records albums
Island Records albums
Albums produced by Ian Anderson
Albums recorded at Morgan Sound Studios